The Oxford Magazine is a review magazine and newspaper published in Oxford, England.

History
The Oxford Magazine was established in 1883 and published weekly during Oxford University terms. Contributors included: J. R. R. Tolkien, whose character Tom Bombadil, who later featured in The Lord of the Rings, first appeared in the magazine around 1933.
A joint poem by C. S. Lewis and Owen Barfield called "Abecedarium Philosophicum" was published on 30 November 1933. Dorothy Sayers published two of her poems, Hymn in Contemplation of Sudden Death and Epitaph for a Young Musician, in the magazine. W. H. Auden published his early poem, The Sunken Lane, in Oxford Magazine while he was an undergraduate at Oxford University. The magazine has also published poets such as H. W. Garrod, Olivia McCannon, Jude Cowan Montague, Michael Gessner, Kieron Winn, John Wain, Elizabeth Jennings, and others.

It now functions "as a commentator on university affairs", that is, an independent forum where members of Congregation can debate academic policy. While it is distributed along with the Oxford University Gazette, it sometimes carries articles critical of the University's leadership.

The magazine continues to publish poetry, including the work of Oxford Professor of Poetry Simon Armitage. Lucy Newlyn has been the literary editor of the magazine since 2011. The previous literary editor of the magazine was the poet Bernard O'Donoghue, who was preceded by the poet David Constantine. The general editor of the magazine in 2021 was Tim Horder, Emeritus Fellow in Medicine at Jesus College, Oxford.

Latterly issued four times each term, the magazine became online only in December 2020 saving the university ₤45,000 a year. In 2022 the university ended all personnel and computer support, leaving the editors unable to continue publication. Academic staff prepared a motion for debate at Congregation in November 2022 which "instructs" the university council to reverse the decision and to ensure the continued publication of Oxford Magazine under the preexisting arrangements. Council later stated that the motion was acceptable to it and agreed to "continue the arrangements for the Oxford Magazine which were in place in 2021–22 whilst its longer-term future is debated."

It should not be confused with Oxford Magazine or In Oxford Magazine, both commercial listings/shopping magazines covering the City of Oxford, nor with an earlier periodical also called The Oxford Magazine which was published in London from 1768 to 1776.

See also 
 Oxford Poetry

References

External links 

 Website (access restricted to members of the University)

Literary magazines published in the United Kingdom
Weekly magazines published in the United Kingdom
Magazines established in 1883
Mass media in Oxford
Publications associated with the University of Oxford